Zhongzhou Reef also known as Ban Than Reef and Centre Cay (Mandarin) is a small coral reef on the north edge of the Tizard Bank in the Spratly Islands, South China Sea under administration by the Republic of China (Taiwan) .

The reef is also claimed by the People's Republic of China, the Philippines, and Vietnam.

As many as 51 species of migratory birds inhabit the reef for short stays. The surrounding waters contain a rich marine ecosystem with plentiful staghorn coral. Shellfish species such as Harpago chiragra and Cassis cornuta can be found on the reef, and the surrounding waters contain various common tropical fish and coral reef fish. The reef geology is not suitable for plant growth.

The reef has no groundwater source. Though currently uninhabited by humans, the Taiwanese Coast Guard sends regular patrols via M8 speedboats from nearby Taiping Island. 
These patrols circle the reef, in addition to landing, making inspections and carrying out ecological surveys.
The Vietnam People's Navy also sends patrols from nearby Sand Cay.

Recent history

The reef was included within the area claimed by China in 1935, and this claim was reiterated in a map published in 1947.

Scientists from Taiwan conducted ecological research on green turtles living on the reef from 2002 to 2003.

On 16 August 2003, the Taiwanese Minister of the Interior Yu Cheng-hsien visited the reef, travelling via M8 speedboat, and planted a Taiwanese flag in a declaration of sovereignty. On 28 March 2004, the Taiwanese Coast Guard Administration completed the construction of wooden observation kiosks on the reef.
In September 2010, the ROC Environmental Protection Agency conducted environmental quality sampling intending on monitoring reef marine water quality.

On 22 March 2012, a routine patrol of the Taiwanese Coast Guard came into contact with Vietnamese patrol boats near the reef; following the incident, Taiwanese legislators Lin Yu-fang, Chen Zhenxiang and Chen Zhankai visited the reef by M8 speedboats.

See also
Pratas Island
Taiping Island
List of islands of Taiwan
List of maritime features in the Spratly Islands

References

南沙群島（中華民國行政院海巡署）

External links
 Small photo of the reef, also showing a wooden platform.

Reefs of the Spratly Islands
Islands of Taiwan
Landforms of Kaohsiung
Tizard Bank
Reefs of the Pacific Ocean